Clarence Otto Pauling (March 19, 1928 – May 6, 1995) better known and published as Clarence Paul, was an American songwriter, record producer and singer who was best known for his career with Detroit's Motown Records.

Early life and career
Born in Winston-Salem, North Carolina, United States, Paul was the son of Lowman Pauling and Arsula Price. His brother was guitarist/songwriter Lowman Pauling Jr. The two brothers co-founded The "5" Royales singing group. Their father was a coal miner in Bluefield, West Virginia, where the brothers listened to country music on the town's only radio station. In Winston-Salem, the brothers formed the gospel group, the Royal Sons Quintet, later to become The "5" Royales. Paul dropped the "ing" from his last name after moving to Detroit in the 1950s, so he would not to be confused with his older brother.

Writing and production career
In 1958, he had one of his first major songwriting credits. He co-wrote and recorded "I Need Your Lovin'" for the Hanover label. It was covered less than a year later, in 1959, and became a number-14 R&B hit for Roy Hamilton. His other notable songs included "A Place in the Sun", "Hey, Love", and "Until You Come Back to Me".

At Motown, he gained fame as Stevie Wonder's mentor and main producer, during Wonder's teenage years. He co-wrote Wonder's first hit song, "Fingertips" (1963). He also sang backup vocals on Wonder's top-ten version of Bob Dylan's "Blowin' in the Wind", and Wonder's version of "Funny How Time Slips Away". Paul also produced early Temptations records and wrote/co-wrote such hits as "Until You Come Back to Me (That's What I'm Gonna Do)" originally for Wonder, and later given to Aretha Franklin who made it a #1 hit, and "Hitch Hike" for Marvin Gaye, later covered by The Rolling Stones, and others.  Paul relocated from Detroit to Los Angeles in the early 1970s.

Later life
Paul retired to Las Vegas, Nevada. He died of complications of heart disease and diabetes, at Cedars-Sinai Medical Center in Los Angeles, California on May 6, 1995, at the age of 67.

Selected discography

Singles

Albums

References

External links
The Clarence Paul Page

1928 births
1995 deaths
20th-century African-American musicians
20th-century American businesspeople
20th-century American musicians
African-American songwriters
Deaths from diabetes
Motown artists
Musicians from Winston-Salem, North Carolina
Record producers from North Carolina
Songwriters from North Carolina